The Hoge Brug (Dutch for "high bridge", also known by its Maastrichtian dialect name: Hoeg Brögk) is a pedestrian and cycle bridge that spans the Meuse (Dutch: Maas) in Maastricht, Netherlands.

Gallery

References

Bridges over the Meuse
Cyclist bridges in the Netherlands
Steel bridges in the Netherlands
Bridges in Maastricht